George Frederick Nidd (9 January 1870 – September 1956) was an English professional footballer, who played for a large number of clubs in the Football League and Southern League in the late 19th and early 20th centuries. His primary position was full back, but he had spells in goal for Grimsby Town and Watford.

Personal life 
Nidd was born in Kirton and as of 1891 he was working as a clerk in Walton. In 1911, his occupation was listed as a manufacturer in St Pancras. After retiring from football, Nidd returned to live in Watford and he served the final months of the First World War in the Royal Air Force.

Career statistics

References 

1869 births
1956 deaths
English footballers
Association football goalkeepers
English Football League players
Southern Football League players
Everton F.C. players
Southport F.C. players
Preston North End F.C. players
Bury F.C. players
Stalybridge Rovers F.C. players
Halliwell Rovers F.C. players
Lincoln City F.C. players
Grimsby Town F.C. players
Watford F.C. players
Brentford F.C. players
Fulham F.C. players
Grays Athletic F.C. players
Leyton Orient F.C. players
Watford F.C. wartime guest players
Outfield association footballers who played in goal

Association football fullbacks
Royal Air Force personnel of World War I
People from Kirton, Lincolnshire